Reczek (also: Reczyca) is a river of Poland, a right tributary of the Ina near Suchań.

Rivers of Poland
Rivers of West Pomeranian Voivodeship